Barium chromate, named barium tetraoxochromate(VI) by the IUPAC, is a yellow sand like powder with the formula BaCrO4. It is a known oxidizing agent and produces a green flame when heated, a result of the barium ions.

History
The first naturally occurring barium chromate was found in the country of Jordan. The brown crystals found perched on host rocks were named hashemite in honor of the Hashemite Kingdom of Jordan. The hashemite crystals range in color from light yellowish-brown to a darker greenish-brown and are usually less than 1mm in length.

The hashemite crystals are not composed of pure barium chromate but instead contain some small sulfur content as well. The different crystals contain a range of sulfur impurities ranging from the more pure dark crystals, Ba1.00(Cr0.93, S0.07)1.00O4, to the less pure light crystals, Ba1.00(Cr0.64, S0.36)1.00O4.

Hashemite was found to be an isostructural chromate analog of baryte, BaSO4.

Preparation and Reactions
It can be synthesized by reacting barium hydroxide or barium chloride with potassium chromate. 
\mathsf{{Ba(OH)2} + K2CrO4 -> BaCrO4(v) + 2KOH}

Alternatively, it can be created by the interaction of barium chloride with sodium chromate.  The precipitate is then washed, filtered, and dried.

It is very insoluble in water, but is soluble in acids:

Ksp = [Ba2+][CrO42−] = 2.1 × 10−10

It can react with barium hydroxide in the presence of sodium azide to create barium chromate(V).  The reaction releases oxygen and water.
 \mathsf{{4BaCrO4}+2Ba(OH)2 ->[\ce{NaN3}] {2Ba3(CrO4)2} +O_2{\uparrow} + 2H2O{\uparrow}}

Common Uses
Barium chromate has been found to be useful in many capacities. The compound is often used as a carrier for the chromium ions.
One such case is the use of barium chromate as a sulfate scavenger in chromium electroplating baths. Over time the chromium concentration of the bath will decrease until the bath is no longer functional. Adding barium chromate enhances the life of the bath by adding to the chromic acid concentration.

Barium chromate is an oxidizing agent, making it useful as a burn rate modifier in pyrotechnic compositions. It is especially useful in delay compositions such as delay fuses.

Barium chromate is used as a corrosion inhibitive pigment when zinc-alloy electroplating surfaces.

When mixed with solid fumaric acid, barium chromate can be used in the removal of impurities and residual moisture from organic dry-cleaning solvents or from petroleum fuels.

Barium chromate is also used in the composition of a catalyst for alkane dehydrogenation.

Barium has also been used to color paints. The pigment known as lemon yellow often contained barium chromate mixed with lead sulfate. Due to its moderate tinting strength lemon yellow was not employed very frequently in oil painting. Pierre-Auguste Renoir and Claude Monet are known to have painted with lemon yellow.

Research
In 2004 a method was found for making single-crystalline ABO4 type nanorods. This method consisted of a modified template synthesis technique that was originally used for the synthesis of organic microtubules. Nanoparticles are allowed to grow in the pores of alumina membranes of various sizes. The varying sizes of the pores allow the growth to be controlled and cause the shapes to be reproducible. The alumina is then dissolved, leaving the nanoparticles behind intact. The synthesis can be carried out at room temperature, greatly reducing the cost and constrictions on conditions.

In 2010, a study was conducted on four hexavalent chromium compounds to test the carcinogenic effects of chromium. The chromium ions accumulate in the bronchial bifurcation sites, settling into the tissue and inducing tumors. Using zinc chromate as a standard, it was discovered that barium chromate is both genotoxic and cytotoxic. The cytotoxicity was determined to most likely be a result of the genotoxicity, but the cause of the genotoxicity is yet unknown.

Safety
Barium chromate is toxic. Chromates, when pulverized and inhaled, are carcinogens.

References

Further study
 Kühn, H. and Curran, M., Strontium, Barium and Calcium Chromates, in Artists' Pigments. A Handbook of Their History and Characteristics, Vol. 1: Feller, R.L. (Ed.) Oxford University Press 1986, p. 205 – 207.
 Lemon yellow, ColourLex

Barium compounds
Chromates
Pyrotechnic oxidizers
Oxidizing agents